Pamlico County is a county located in the U.S. state of North Carolina. As of the 2020 census, the population was 12,276. Its county seat is Bayboro.

Pamlico County is part of the New Bern, NC Metropolitan Statistical Area.

History
The county was formed in 1872 from parts of Beaufort and Craven counties. It was named for Pamlico Sound, which adjoins it.  Vernacular usage in the area, especially in Craven County, refers to Pamlico County as being "down in the county." Prior to 1872, it was a part of Craven County and has a very low elevation. Most of the county, according to FRIS, North Carolina Flood Risk Information System, is subject to flooding in storm surges. After it was separated from Craven, the old nickname survives.  Pamlico County remains rural in character and flavor, although the last decade has brought a good deal of residential development, largely the result of northern retirees and investors attracted to the many miles of waterfront property.

The county is anchored on the east by the Town of Oriental, a popular waystation for boaters traveling the Intracoastal Waterway, and by unincorporated Lowland. New Bern across the county line in Craven County to the west, is the primary trade area for Pamlico County. The unincorporated community of Olympia is in the western county.

Geography

State and local protected area 
 Goose Creek Game Land (part)

Major water bodies 
 Bay River
 Goose Creek
 Intracoastal Waterway
 Neuse River
 Pamlico River

Adjacent counties
 Beaufort County - north
 Hyde County - northeast
 Carteret County - southeast
 Craven County - southwest

Major highways

Major infrastructure 
 Cherry Branch - Minnesott Beach Ferry (To Craven County)

Demographics

Census reports show a marked drop of nearly 10 percent in county population from 1910 to 1920, the period of the Great Migration of African Americans from rural areas of the South to northern and midwestern industrial cities offering more economic and social opportunities. Workers were recruited by northern industries, including the Pennsylvania Railroad, which was rapidly expanding at the time.

2020 census

As of the 2020 United States census, there were 12,276 people, 5,416 households, and 3,589 families residing in the county.

2000 census
As of the census of 2000, there were 12,934 people, 5,178 households, and 3,717 families residing in the county.  The population density was 38 people per square mile (15/km2).  There were 6,781 housing units at an average density of 20 per square mile (8/km2).  The racial makeup of the county was 73.17% White, 24.57% Black or African American, 0.53% Native American, 0.38% Asian, 0.02% Pacific Islander, 0.59% from other races, and 0.74% from two or more races.  1.32% of the population were Hispanic or Latino of any race.

There were 5,178 households, out of which 25.20% had children under the age of 18 living with them, 56.60% were married couples living together, 11.50% had a female householder with no husband present, and 28.20% were non-families. 25.00% of all households were made up of individuals, and 12.10% had someone living alone who was 65 years of age or older.  The average household size was 2.38 and the average family size was 2.81.

In the county, the population was spread out, with 21.10% under the age of 18, 6.40% from 18 to 24, 25.80% from 25 to 44, 28.00% from 45 to 64, and 18.80% who were 65 years of age or older.  The median age was 43 years. For every 100 females there were 101.40 males.  For every 100 females age 18 and over, there were 99.80 males.

The median income for a household in the county was $34,084, and the median income for a family was $41,659. Males had a median income of $31,806 versus $21,344 for females. The per capita income for the county was $18,005.  About 11.80% of families and 15.30% of the population were below the poverty line, including 24.20% of those under age 18 and 13.40% of those age 65 or over.

Government and politics
Pamlico County is governed by an elected, seven-member Board of Commissioners. The county is a member of the regional Eastern Carolina Council of Governments.

Communities

Towns

 Alliance
 Arapahoe
 Bayboro (county seat and largest town)
 Grantsboro
 Mesic
 Minnesott Beach
 Oriental
 Stonewall
 Vandemere

Census-designated place
 Hobucken

Unincorporated communities
 Florence
 Janerio
 Lowland
 Maribel
 Merritt
 Olympia
 Reelsboro
 Whortonsville

Townships
By the requirements of the North Carolina Constitution of 1868, the county was divided into 5 townships, which are only numbered:

 Township 1
 Township 2
 Township 3
 Township 4
 Township 5

See also
 List of counties in North Carolina
 National Register of Historic Places listings in Pamlico County, North Carolina
 North Carolina Ferry System

References

External links

 
 
 Pamlico County Chamber of Commerce
 NCGenWeb Pamlico County - free genealogy resources for the county
 The Pamlico News - The Weekly Newspaper for Pamlico County
 The County Compass - Weekly newspaper serving Pamlico County, NC

 
1872 establishments in North Carolina
New Bern micropolitan area
Populated places established in 1872